Return to Hansala is a 2008 Spanish film directed by Chus Gutiérrez which stars Farah Hamed and José Luis García Pérez. It won the Golden Pyramid Award at the 32nd Cairo International Film Festival and was also screened at the 2008 Dubai International Film Festival.

Plot 
At the beginning of this decade the bodies of eleven young Moroccan immigrants who were trying to cross the Strait of Gibraltar appeared on the beaches of Rota. From their clothes, it was discovered that they all came from the same village, Hansala. The film tries to portray that event through the eyes of Martín, a funeral parlor owner who tries to make money on their deaths, and Leila, the sister of one of the dead boys. Together, they adventure into trying to repatriate the boy's body by van and live an intense moral experience that will lead them to question their beliefs.

The film begins with several bodies washing up on the Spanish shore, Playa de Getares, near the coastal town of Algeciras. One of them is the younger brother of Leila, a refugee living in the town. She had encouraged him to risk the boat crossing to Spain, against their family's wishes. After identifying her brother, Leila decides to repatriate his body, and face the wrath of her parents. Teaming up with a Spanish undertaker Martin, the pair embark on the hazardous trip to Leila's mountain village of Hansala in the Moroccan countryside. Leila's most fundamental beliefs are challenged, as she must face her family, and their grief, anger and love. Martin meanwhile is surprised by his welcome in the village. Director Chus Gutiérrez presents with great sensitivity the opposing viewpoints of her main protagonists, artfully, contrasting the lives of rich and poor, separated by only a few hundred miles.

Cast

Production 
The film was produced by Maestranza Films and Muac Films. Shooting locations included Algeciras and Los Barrios. It was shot in Spanish, Arabic and Berber.

Release 
The film premiered at the Toronto International Film Festival in September 2008. Its festival run also included Tangier, the Seville European Film Festival, the Valladolid International Film Festival (Seminci), and the 32nd Cairo International Film Festival, among others. It was theatrically released in Spain in 2009.

Awards 

|-
| rowspan = "2" align = "center" | 2008 || 53rd Valladolid International Film Festival || colspan = "2" | Jury Special Prize ||  || rowspan = "2" | 
|-
| 32nd Cairo International Film Festival || colspan = "2" | Golden Pyramid || 
|-
| rowspan = "3" align = "center" | 2009 || rowspan = "3" | 23rd Goya Awards || Best Original Screenplay || Chus Gutiérrez, Juan Carlos Rubio ||  || rowspan = "3" | 
|-
| Best New Actress || Farah Hamed || 
|-
| Best Original Song || Tao Gutiérrez || 
|}

See also 
 List of Spanish films of 2009

References 

 

Films set in Andalusia
2008 films
Spanish drama films
Films about immigration to Spain
Films shot in the province of Cádiz
Maestranza Films films
2000s Spanish films